Governor Cherry may refer to:

Francis Cherry (governor) (1908–1965), 35th Governor of Arkansas
R. Gregg Cherry (1891–1957), 61st Governor of North Carolina